A list of films produced in Egypt in 1931. For an A-Z list of films currently on Wikipedia, see :Category:Egyptian films.

External links
 Egyptian films of 1931 at the Internet Movie Database
 Egyptian films of 1931 elCinema.com

Lists of Egyptian films by year
1931 in Egypt
Lists of 1931 films by country or language